A boat club is a sports club serving boat owners, particularly those interested in rowing and yachting, but also kayaking, canoeing, motor boats and other small boats.

See also
Rowing club
Yacht club

 
Boats
Sports clubs